The Hexagon is a multi-purpose theatre and arts venue in Reading, Berkshire, England.  Built in 1977 in the shape of an elongated hexagon, the theatre is operated by Reading Borough Council under the name "Reading Arts and Venues" along with South Street Arts Centre and Reading's concert hall.

Architecture 
The theatre was built in 1977 by Robert Matthew Johnson Marshall (RMJM), who also built the adjacent Civic Centre. The original design featured a proscenium but no fly tower. Upon opening, the venue was comparable to Derby's Assembly Rooms—which also opened in 1977—but the Hexagon was described as architecturally and acoustically superior.

As the building was designed to operate as a multi-use venue, the arena-style seating was used to avoid limited visibility.  This proved useful for sports such as snooker or boxing, but rendered a number of seats unusable during performances that utilised the proscenium. A review of the Hexagon's architectural design in a 1979 edition of the Architects' Journal surmised that dramatic performances were seen as a low priority in the design—despite an estimated quarter of all events being of this type.

The stalls, which use removable and retractable seats, have less headroom than the balcony above.  This results in shallow overhangs.  The theatre floor, which usually holds stall seating, is adjustable to allow a contiguous service with the stage, providing a  surface. The balconies, which are separated by gaps around the auditorium, are similar to those at Christchurch Town Hall in New Zealand.  Similarly, the inclined panels around the room—to introduce reflections—may have been inspired by that venue.

The venue allows a number of different seating configurations, which affect the capacity. For performances with a proscenium arch, the capacity is 946. This increases to 1,200 for an all-seated concert and 1,686 for standing with balcony seating. The various seating arrangements affect the auditorium volume— and  respectively for music and drama performances, as well as the reverberation times—1.1 seconds for concerts and 0.9 seconds for drama.

Acoustics 

Originally, the Hexagon used an electronically assisted reverberation system; this has now been removed.  In a review of the system, one author wrote that the system "seemed inaudible
in the stalls but made a minor contribution in the balcony", concluding that it "still [left] an inadequate sense of reverberation." Acoustic panelling is used throughout the auditorium.  The ceiling features rotatable acoustic screens to provide reflections to the balcony seats.

In acoustic tests performed by Sound Research Laboratories, the venue was found to have a short reverberation time—roughly one second in theatre configuration—which results in a high objective clarity.  The assisted resonance system was found to increase this to 1.5 seconds at 200 Hz. The balcony seats have been described as having an inadequate level of early reflections and speech performance was judged to be poor. It has been concluded that rectifying the room's acoustics for the benefit of theatre and speech would be detrimental to other uses of the venue such as boxing.

Events include classical music, comedy, dance, drama, pop and rock concerts. In past years the venue has also been used for snooker.

References

External links 

 
 Ents24.com —What's On & Tickets

Buildings and structures in Reading, Berkshire
Music venues in Berkshire
Theatres in Berkshire
Snooker venues
Music venues completed in 1977